(born January 25, 1992) is a Canadian Olympic ski jumper from Calgary, Alberta. Tanaka first started ski jumping when she was ten, later competing internationally in 2004, at the age of 12.  In October 2005, when she was 13, Tanaka won gold in a Continental Cup event. At the 2006 World Junior Championships, Tanako placed second, winning silver. In 2008, she got her second Continental Cup victory. Tanaka's career-best happened in 2014 at the Sapporo World Cup, where she placed 4th. In the 2014 Sochi Winter Olympics, Tanaka placed 12th, which was Canada’s best Ladies result until 2022, where a mixed team won bronze. Tanaka moved on from competing in 2018, after recovering from two ACL tears in her left knee, as well as a concussion she got from a car accident.

References

Canadian female ski jumpers
Canadian sportspeople of Japanese descent
Skiers from Calgary
1992 births
Olympic ski jumpers of Canada
Ski jumpers at the 2014 Winter Olympics
Living people
21st-century Canadian women